Emmer is a river of Lower Saxony and North Rhine-Westphalia, Germany. It flows into the Weser in Emmerthal.

See also
List of rivers of Lower Saxony
List of rivers of North Rhine-Westphalia

References

Rivers of Lower Saxony
Rivers of North Rhine-Westphalia
 
Rivers of Germany